The Mauritian Republic Cup is an annual Mauritian football competition created by the Mauritius Football Association in 1990. It usually takes place in the summer of each year. Along with the MFA Cup, it serves as a major cup competition for teams in the top flight of Mauritian football, the Mauritian League.

Winners
1990 : Sunrise 2-1 Fire Brigade SC
1991 : Fire Brigade SC 4-0 Young Tigers
1992 : Sunrise 4-1 RBBS
1993 : Sunrise 3-2 Fire Brigade SC
1994 : Sunrise 1-0 Maurice Espoir
1995 : Fire Brigade SC 3-1 Maurice Espoir
1996 : Sunrise 4-0 Scouts Club
1997 : Sunrise 0-0 (5 - 2 pen) Fire Brigade SC
1998 : Sunrise 4-3 Fire Brigade SC
1999 : Fire Brigade SC SC 4-0 Faucon Noir
2000 : No Competition
2001 : AS Port-Louis 2000 2-1 Olympique de Moka 
2002 : Union Sportive de Beau-Bassin Rose-Hill 5-1 AS de Vacoas-Phoenix
2003 : Faucon Flacq 2-1  Union Sportive de Beau-Bassin Rose-Hill
2004 : AS Port-Louis 2000 2-1 Union Sportive de Beau-Bassin Rose-Hill
2005 : AS Port-Louis 2000 2-0 Union Sportive de Beau-Bassin Rose-Hill
2006 : AS de Vacoas-Phoenix 2-2 (5 - 4 pen) PAS Mates
2007 : Curepipe Starlight SC 1-0 Savanne SC
2008 : Curepipe Starlight SC 2-0 AS Port-Louis 2000
2009 : Savanne SC 2-0 Curepipe Starlight SC
2010 : Pamplemousses SC 0-0 (6 - 5 pen) Petite Rivière Noire SC
2011 : Pamplemousses SC 3-1 Petite Rivière Noire SC
2011/12 : Savanne SC 1-1 (aet, 11-10 pen) AS Rivière du Rempart
2012/13 : Pamplemousses SC 1-0 Curepipe Starlight SC
2013/14 : AS Port-Louis 2000 1-0 Curepipe Starlight SC
2014/15 : La Cure Sylvester 1-1 (aet, 5-4 pen) Pamplemousses SC
2015/16 : Cercle de Joachim 1-0 AS Port-Louis 2000
2016/17 : Pamplemousses SC 4-2 GRSE Wanderers
2017/18 : Bolton City Youth Club 2-1 Petite Rivière Noire FC

References

 
Football competitions in Mauritius
National association football cups